James Graham Ballard (15 November 193019 April 2009) was an English novelist, short story writer, satirist, and essayist known for provocative works of fiction which explored the relations between human psychology, technology, sex, and mass media. He first became associated with the New Wave of science fiction for post-apocalyptic novels such as The Drowned World (1962), but later courted controversy for works such as the experimental short story collection The Atrocity Exhibition (1970), which included the 1968 story "Why I Want to Fuck Ronald Reagan", and the novel Crash (1973), a story about a renegade group of car crash fetishists.

In 1984, Ballard won broader recognition for his war novel Empire of the Sun, a semi-autobiographical account of a young British boy's experiences in Shanghai during Japanese occupation; the story was adapted into a 1987 film directed by Steven Spielberg. The author's journey from youth to mid-age would be chronicled, with fictional inflections, in The Kindness of Women (1991) and in direct autobiography in Miracles of Life (2008). Several of his earlier works have been adapted into films, including David Cronenberg's controversial 1996 adaptation Crash and Ben Wheatley's 2015 adaptation of Ballard's 1975 novel High-Rise.

The literary distinctiveness of Ballard's fiction has given rise to the adjective "Ballardian", defined by the Collins English Dictionary as "resembling or suggestive of the conditions described in J. G. Ballard's novels and stories, especially dystopian modernity, bleak man-made landscapes and the psychological effects of technological, social or environmental developments". The Oxford Dictionary of National Biography entry describes Ballard's work as being occupied with "Eros, Thanatos, mass media and emergent technologies".

Life

Shanghai

Ballard's father, James (1901–1966), was a chemist at a Manchester-based textile firm, the Calico Printers' Association, and became chairman and managing director of its subsidiary in Shanghai, the China Printing and Finishing Company. His mother was Edna (1905–1998), née Johnstone. Ballard was born and raised in the Shanghai International Settlement, an area under foreign control where people "lived an American style of life". He was sent to the Cathedral School, the Anglican Holy Trinity Church near the Bund, Shanghai. After the outbreak of the Second Sino-Japanese War, Ballard's family were forced to evacuate their suburban home temporarily and rent a house in central Shanghai to avoid the shells fired by Chinese and Japanese forces.

After the Japanese attack on Hong Kong, the Japanese occupied the International Settlement in Shanghai. In early 1943, they began to intern Allied civilians, and the Ballards were sent to the Lunghua Civilian Assembly Centre. He spent over two years, the remainder of World War II, in the internment camp. His family lived in a small area in G block, a two-storey residence for 40 families. He attended school in the camp, the teachers being camp inmates from a number of professions. As he explained later in his autobiography Miracles of Life, these experiences formed the basis of Empire of the Sun, although Ballard exercised considerable artistic licence in writing the book, such as the removal of his parents from the bulk of the story.

It has been supposed that Ballard's exposure to the atrocities of war at an impressionable age explains the apocalyptic and violent nature of much of his fiction. Martin Amis wrote that Empire of the Sun "gives shape to what shaped him". Ballard's own account of the experience was more nuanced: "I don't think you can go through the experience of war without one's perceptions of the world being forever changed. The reassuring stage set that everyday reality in the suburban west presents to us is torn down; you see the ragged scaffolding, and then you see the truth beyond that, and it can be a frightening experience." But also: "I have—I won't say happy—not unpleasant memories of the camp. [...] I remember a lot of the casual brutality and beatings-up that went on—but at the same time we children were playing a hundred and one games all the time!" Ballard later became an atheist.

Britain and Canada
In late 1945, after the end of the war, his mother returned to Britain with Ballard and his sister on the SS Arawa. They lived in the outskirts of Plymouth, and he attended The Leys School in Cambridge. He won an essay prize whilst at the school but did not contribute to the school magazine. After a couple of years his mother and sister returned to China, rejoining Ballard's father, leaving Ballard to live with his grandparents when not boarding at school. In 1949 he went on to study medicine at King's College, Cambridge, with the intention of becoming a psychiatrist.

At university, Ballard was writing avant-garde fiction heavily influenced by psychoanalysis and surrealist painters. At this time, he wanted to become a writer as well as pursue a medical career. In May 1951, when Ballard was in his second year at Cambridge, his short story "The Violent Noon", a Hemingwayesque pastiche written to please the contest's jury, won a crime story competition and was published in the student newspaper Varsity.

Encouraged by the publication of his story and realising that clinical medicine would not leave him time to write, Ballard abandoned his medical studies, and in October 1951 he enrolled at Queen Mary College to read English literature. He dropped out after a year to become a copywriter for an advertising agency, after which he worked as an encyclopaedia salesman. He kept writing short fiction but found it impossible to get published.

In early 1954 Ballard joined the Royal Air Force and was sent to the Royal Canadian Air Force flight-training base in Moose Jaw, Saskatchewan, Canada.  There he discovered science fiction in American magazines. While in the RAF, he also wrote his first science fiction story, "Passport to Eternity", as a pastiche and summary of the American science fiction he had read.  The story was not published until 1962.

Ballard left the RAF in 1955 after thirteen months and returned to England. In 1955 he married Helen Mary Matthews and settled in Chiswick. Matthews was a secretary at the Daily Express. The first of their three children was born the following year. He made his science fiction debut in December 1956 with two short stories, "Escapement", published in New Worlds and "Prima Belladonna", published in Science Fantasy. The editor of New Worlds, Edward J. Carnell, remained an important supporter of Ballard's writing, and published nearly all of his early stories.

From 1958 Ballard worked as assistant editor on the scientific journal Chemistry and Industry. His interest in art led to his involvement in the emerging Pop Art movement, and in the late 1950s he exhibited collages that represented his ideas for a new kind of novel. Ballard's avant-garde inclinations did not sit comfortably in the science fiction mainstream of that time, which held attitudes he considered philistine. Briefly attending the 1957 World Science Fiction Convention in London, Ballard left disillusioned and demoralised and did not write another story for a year. By 1965, however, he had become an editor of the avant-garde Ambit magazine, which was more in keeping with his aesthetic ideals.

Full-time writing career
In 1960 Ballard moved with his family to the middle-class Shepperton in Surrey, where he lived for the rest of his life and which would later give rise to his moniker as the "Seer of Shepperton". Finding that commuting to work did not leave him time to write, Ballard decided he had to make a break and become a full-time writer. He wrote his first novel, The Wind from Nowhere, over a two-week holiday to gain a foothold as a professional writer, not intending it as a "serious novel"; in books published later, it is omitted from the list of his works. When it was published in January 1962, he resigned from his job at Chemistry and Industry, and from then on supported himself and his family as a writer.

Later that year his second novel, The Drowned World, was published, establishing Ballard as a notable figure in the fledgling New Wave movement of science fiction. Collections of his stories started getting published, and he began a period of great literary productivity, while pushing to expand the scope of acceptable material for science fiction with such stories as "The Terminal Beach".

In 1964 Ballard's wife Mary died suddenly of pneumonia, leaving him to raise their three children—James, Fay and Bea Ballard—by himself. Ballard never remarried, but a few years later his friend and fellow author Michael Moorcock introduced him to Claire Walsh, who became his partner for the rest of his life (he died at her London residence), and is often referred to in his writings as "Claire Churchill". Walsh, who worked in publishing during the 1960s and 1970s, was a sounding board for many of his story ideas, and introduced him to the expatriate community in the south of France which formed the basis of several novels.

After the shock of his wife's death, Ballard began in 1965 to write the stories that became The Atrocity Exhibition, while continuing to produce stories within the science fiction genre. In 1967 Algis Budrys listed Ballard, Brian W. Aldiss, Roger Zelazny, and Samuel R. Delany as "an earthshaking new kind of" writer, and leaders of the New Wave. The Atrocity Exhibition (1969) proved controversial—it was the subject of an obscenity trial, and in the United States, publisher Doubleday destroyed almost the entire print run before it was distributed—but it gained Ballard recognition as a literary writer. It remains one of his iconic works, and was filmed in 2001.

A chapter of The Atrocity Exhibition is titled "Crash!", and in 1970 Ballard organised an exhibition of crashed cars at the New Arts Laboratory, simply called "Crashed Cars". The crashed vehicles were displayed without commentary, inspiring vitriolic responses and vandalism. In both the story and the art exhibition, Ballard dealt with the sexual potential of car crashes, a theme he also explored in a short film in which he appeared with Gabrielle Drake in 1971. His interest in the topic culminated in the novel Crash in 1973. The main character of Crash is called James Ballard and lives in Shepperton, though other biographical details do not match the writer, and curiosity about the relationship between the character and his author increased when Ballard was in a serious car accident shortly after completing the novel.

Crash was also controversial upon publication. In 1996, the film adaptation by David Cronenberg was met by a tabloid uproar in the UK, with the Daily Mail campaigning for it to be banned. In the years following the initial publication of Crash, Ballard produced two further novels: 1974's Concrete Island, about a man who becomes stranded in the waste area of a high-speed motorway, and High-Rise, about a modern luxury high rise apartment building's descent into tribal warfare.

Ballard published several novels and short story collections throughout the 1970s and 1980s, but his breakthrough into the mainstream came with Empire of the Sun in 1984, based on his years in Shanghai and the Lunghua internment camp. It became a best-seller, was shortlisted for the Booker Prize and awarded the Guardian Fiction Prize and James Tait Black Memorial Prize for fiction. It made Ballard known to a wider audience, although the books that followed failed to achieve the same degree of success. Empire of the Sun was filmed by Steven Spielberg in 1987, starring a young Christian Bale as Jim (Ballard). Ballard himself appears briefly in the film, and he has described the experience of seeing his childhood memories reenacted and reinterpreted as bizarre.

Ballard continued to write until the end of his life, and also contributed occasional journalism and criticism to the British press. Of his later novels, Super-Cannes (2000) was well received, winning the regional Commonwealth Writers' Prize. These later novels often marked a move away from science fiction, instead engaging with elements of a traditional crime novel. Ballard was offered a CBE in 2003, but refused, calling it "a Ruritanian charade that helps to prop up our top-heavy monarchy". In June 2006, he was diagnosed with terminal prostate cancer, which metastasised to his spine and ribs. The last of his books published in his lifetime was the autobiography Miracles of Life, written after his diagnosis. His final published short story, "The Dying Fall", appeared in the 1996 issue 106 of Interzone, a British sci-fi magazine. It was reproduced in The Guardian on 25 April 2009. He was buried in Kensal Green Cemetery.

Posthumous publication
In October 2008, before his death, Ballard's literary agent, Margaret Hanbury, brought an outline for a book by Ballard with the working title Conversations with My Physician: The Meaning, if Any, of Life to the Frankfurt Book Fair. The physician in question is oncologist Professor Jonathan Waxman of Imperial College, London, who was treating Ballard for prostate cancer. While it was to be in part a book about cancer, and Ballard's struggle with it, it reportedly was to move on to broader themes. In April 2009 The Guardian reported that HarperCollins announced that Ballard's Conversations with My Physician could not be finished and plans to publish it were abandoned.

In 2013, a 17-page untitled typescript listed as "Vermilion Sands short story in draft" in the British Library catalogue and edited into an 8,000-word text by Bernard Sigaud appeared in a short-lived French reissue of the collection under the title "Le labyrinthe Hardoon" as the first story of the cycle, tentatively dated "late 1955/early 1956" by Sigaud and others.

Archive
In June 2010 the British Library acquired Ballard's personal archives under the British government's acceptance in lieu scheme for death duties. The archive contains eighteen holograph manuscripts for Ballard's novels, including the 840-page manuscript for Empire of the Sun, plus correspondence, notebooks, and photographs from throughout his life. In addition, two typewritten manuscripts for The Unlimited Dream Company are held at the Harry Ransom Center at the University of Texas at Austin.

Dystopian fiction

With the exception of his autobiographical novels, Ballard most commonly wrote in the post-apocalyptic dystopia genre.

His most celebrated novel in this regard is Crash, in which the characters (the protagonist, called Ballard, included) become increasingly obsessed with the violent psychosexuality of car crashes in general, and celebrity car crashes in particular. Ballard's novel was turned into a controversial film by David Cronenberg.

Particularly revered among Ballard's admirers is his short story collection Vermilion Sands (1971), set in an eponymous desert resort town inhabited by forgotten starlets, insane heirs, very eccentric artists, and the merchants and bizarre servants who provide for them. Each story features peculiarly exotic technology such as cloud-carving sculptors performing for a party of eccentric onlookers, poetry-composing computers, orchids with operatic voices and egos to match, phototropic self-painting canvases, etc. In keeping with Ballard's central themes, most notably technologically-mediated masochism, these tawdry and weird technologies service the dark and hidden desires and schemes of the human castaways who occupy Vermilion Sands, typically with psychologically grotesque and physically fatal results. In his introduction to Vermilion Sands, Ballard cites this as his favourite collection.

In a similar vein, his collection Memories of the Space Age explores many varieties of individual and collective psychological fallout from—and initial deep archetypal motivations for—the American space exploration boom of the 1960s and 1970s.

Will Self has described much of his fiction as being concerned with "idealised gated communities; the affluent, and the ennui of affluence [where] the virtualised world is concretised in the shape of these gated developments." He added in these fictional settings "there is no real pleasure to be gained; sex is commodified and devoid of feeling and there is no relationship with the natural world. These communities then implode into some form of violence." Budrys, however, mocked his fiction as "call[ing] for people who don't think ... to be the protagonist of a J. G. Ballard novel, or anything more than a very minor character therein, you must have cut yourself off from the entire body of scientific education".

In addition to his novels, Ballard made extensive use of the short story form. Many of his earliest published works in the 1950s and 1960s were short stories, including influential works like Chronopolis. In an essay on Ballard, Will Wiles notes how his short stories "have a lingering fascination with the domestic interior, with furnishing and appliances", adding, "it's a landscape that he distorts until it shrieks with anxiety". He concludes that "what Ballard saw, and what he expressed in his novels, was nothing less than the effect that the technological world, including our built environment, was having upon our minds and bodies."

Ballard coined the term inverted Crusoeism. Whereas the original Robinson Crusoe became a castaway against his own will, Ballard's protagonists often choose to maroon themselves; hence inverted Crusoeism (e.g., Concrete Island). The concept provides a reason as to why people would deliberately maroon themselves on a remote island; in Ballard's work, becoming a castaway is as much a healing and empowering process as an entrapping one, enabling people to discover a more meaningful and vital existence.

Television
On 13 December 1965, BBC Two screened an adaptation of the short story "Thirteen to Centaurus" directed by Peter Potter. The one-hour drama formed part of the first season of Out of the Unknown and starred Donald Houston as Dr. Francis and James Hunter as Abel Granger. In 2003, Ballard's short story "The Enormous Space" (first published in the science fiction magazine Interzone in 1989, subsequently printed in the collection of Ballard's short stories War Fever) was adapted into an hour-long television film for the BBC entitled Home by Richard Curson Smith, who also directed it. The plot follows a middle-class man who chooses to abandon the outside world and restrict himself to his house, becoming a hermit.

Influence
Ballard is cited as an important forebear of the cyberpunk movement by Bruce Sterling in his introduction to the Mirrorshades anthology, and by author William Gibson. Ballard's parody of American politics, the pamphlet "Why I Want to Fuck Ronald Reagan", which was subsequently included as a chapter in his experimental novel The Atrocity Exhibition, was photocopied and distributed by pranksters at the 1980 Republican National Convention. In the early 1970s, Bill Butler, a bookseller in Brighton, was prosecuted under UK obscenity laws for selling the pamphlet.

In his 2002 book Straw Dogs: Thoughts on Humans and Other Animals, the philosopher John Gray acknowledges Ballard as a major influence on his ideas. The book's publisher quotes Ballard as saying, "Straw Dogs challenges all our assumptions about what it is to be human, and convincingly shows that most of them are delusions." Gray wrote a short essay, in the New Statesman, about a dinner he had with Ballard in which he stated, "Unlike many others, it wasn’t his dystopian vision that gripped my imagination. For me his work was lyrical – an evocation of the beauty that can be gleaned from landscapes of desolation." 

According to literary theorist Brian McHale, The Atrocity Exhibition is a "postmodernist text based on science fiction topoi".

Lee Killough directly cites Ballard's seminal Vermilion Sands short stories as the inspiration for her collection Aventine, also a backwater resort for celebrities and eccentrics where bizarre or frivolous novelty technology facilitates the expression of dark intents and drives. Terry Dowling's milieu of Twilight Beach is also influenced by the stories of Vermilion Sands and other Ballard works.

In Simulacra and Simulation, Jean Baudrillard hailed Crash as the "first great novel of the universe of simulation".

Ballard also had an interest in the relationship between various media. In the early 1970s, he was one of the trustees of the Institute for Research in Art and Technology.

In popular music
Ballard has had a notable influence on popular music, where his work has been used as a basis for lyrical imagery, particularly amongst British post-punk and industrial groups. Examples include albums such as Metamatic by John Foxx, various songs by Joy Division (most famously "Atrocity Exhibition" from Closer and "Disorder" from Unknown Pleasures), "High Rise" by Hawkwind, "Miss the Girl" by The Creatures (based on Crash), "Down in the Park" by Gary Numan, "Chrome Injury" by The Church, "Drowned World" by Madonna, "Warm Leatherette" by The Normal and Atrocity Exhibition by Danny Brown.
Songwriters Trevor Horn and Bruce Woolley credit Ballard's story "The Sound-Sweep" with inspiring The Buggles' hit "Video Killed the Radio Star", and the Buggles' second album included a song entitled "Vermillion Sands".
The 1978 post-punk band Comsat Angels took their name from one of Ballard's short stories. An early instrumental track by British electronic music group The Human League "4JG" bears Ballard's initials as a homage to the author (intended as a response to "2HB" by Roxy Music).

Manic Street Preachers include a sample from an interview with Ballard in their song "Mausoleum".
Additionally, the Manic Street Preachers song, "A Billion Balconies Facing the Sun", is taken from a line in the JG Ballard novel, Cocaine Nights. 
Klaxons named their debut album Myths of the Near Future after one of Ballard's short story collections. The band Empire of the Sun took their name from Ballard's novel. The Sound of Animals Fighting took the name of the song "The Heraldic Beak of the Manufacturer's Medallion" from Crash. UK based Drum and Bass producer Fortitude released an EP in 2016 called "Kline Coma Xero" named after characters in The Atrocity Exhibition. The song "Terminal Beach" by the American band Yacht is a tribute to his short story collection that goes by the same name.. US indie musician and comic book artist Jeffrey Lewis mentions Ballard by name in his song "Cult Boyfriend", on the record "A Turn in The Dream-Songs" (2011), in reference to Ballard's Cult following as an author.

Awards and honours

 1979 BSFA Award for Best Novel for The Unlimited Dream Company
 1984 Guardian Fiction Prize for Empire of the Sun
 1984 James Tait Black Memorial Prize for fiction for Empire of the Sun
 1984  Empire of the Sun shortlisted for the Booker Prize for Fiction
 1997 De Montfort University Honorary doctorate.
 2001 Commonwealth Writers' Prize (Europe & South Asia region) for Super-Cannes
 2008 Golden PEN Award
 2009 Royal Holloway University of London Posthumous honorary doctorate.

Works

Novels

Short story collections

Non-fiction 
 A User's Guide to the Millennium: Essays and Reviews (1996)
 Miracles of Life (autobiography; 2008)

Interviews 
 Paris Review – J.G. Ballard  (1984)
 Re/Search No. 8/9: J.G. Ballard (1985)
 J.G. Ballard: Quotes (2004)
 J.G. Ballard: Conversations (2005)
 Extreme Metaphors (interviews; 2012)

Adaptations

Films 
 When Dinosaurs Ruled the Earth (1970, Val Guest)
 Empire of the Sun (1987, Steven Spielberg)
 Crash (1996, David Cronenberg)
 The Atrocity Exhibition (2000, Jonathan Weiss)
 Low-Flying Aircraft (2002, Solveig Nordlund)
 High-Rise (2015, Ben Wheatley)

Television 
 "Thirteen to Centaurus" (1965) from the short story of the same name – dir. Peter Potter (BBC Two)
 Crash! (1971) dir. Harley Cokliss
 "Minus One" (1991) from the story of the same name – short film dir. by Simon Brooks.
 "Home" (2003) primarily based on "The Enormous Space" – dir. Richard Curson Smith (BBC Four)
 "The Drowned Giant" (2021) from the short story of the same name, is the eighth episode of the second season of the Netflix anthology series Love, Death & Robots

Radio 
 In Nov/Dec 1988, CBC Radio's sci-fi series Vanishing Point ran a seven-episode miniseries of The Stories of J. G. Ballard, which included audio adaptations of "Escapement," "Dead Astronaut," "The Cloud Sculptors of Coral D," "Low Flying Aircraft," "A Question of Re-entry," "News from the Sun" and "Having a Wonderful Time".
 In June 2013, BBC Radio 4 broadcast adaptions of The Drowned World and Concrete Island as part of a season of dystopian fiction entitled Dangerous Visions.

References

Notes

Bibliography

 Ballard, J.G. (1984). Empire of the Sun. .
 Ballard, J.G. (1991). The Kindness of Women. .
 Ballard, J.G. (1993). The Atrocity Exhibition (expanded and annotated edition). .
 Ballard, J.G. (2006). "Look back at Empire". The Guardian, 4 March 2006.
 Baxter, J. (2001). "J.G. Ballard". The Literary Encyclopedia. Retrieved 11 March 2006.
 Baxter, J. (ed.) (2008). J.G. Ballard, London: Continuum. 
 Baxter, John (2011). The Inner Man: The Life of J. G. Ballard. London: Weidenfeld & Nicolson. 
 Brigg, Peter (1985). J.G. Ballard. Rpt. Borgo Press/Wildside Press. 
 Collins English Dictionary. . Quoted in Ballardian: The World of JG Ballard. Retrieved 11 March 2006.
 Cowley, J. (2001). "The Ballard of Shanghai jail". Review of The Complete Stories by J.G. Ballard. The Observer, 4 November 2001. Retrieved 11 March 2006.
 Delville, Michel. J.G. Ballard. Plymouth: Northcote House, 1998.
 Gasiorek, A. (2005). J. G. Ballard. Manchester University Press. 
 Hall, C. "Extreme Metaphor: A Crash Course in the Fiction of JG Ballard". Retrieved 11 March 2006.
 Livingstone, D.B. (1996?). "Prophet with Honour". Retrieved 12 March 2006.
 Luckhurst, R. (1998). The Angle Between Two Walls: The Fiction of J. G. Ballard. Liverpool University Press. 
 McGrath, R.  JG Ballard Book Collection. Retrieved 11 March 2006.
 McGrath, Rick (ed.). The JG Ballard Book. The Terminal Press. 2013. 
 
 Oramus, Dominika. Grave New World. Warsaw: University of Warsaw, 2007.
 Pringle, David, Earth is the Alien Planet: J.G. Ballard's Four-Dimensional Nightmare, San Bernardino, CA: The Borgo Press, 1979.
 Pringle, David (ed.) and Ballard, J.G. (1982). "From Shanghai to Shepperton". Re/Search 8/9: J.G. Ballard: 112–124. .
 Rossi, Umberto (2009). "A Little Something about Dead Astronauts", Science-Fiction Studies, No. 107, 36:1 (March), 101–120.
 Stephenson, Gregory, Out of the Night and into the Dream: A Thematic Study of the Fiction of J.G. Ballard, New York: Greenwood Press, 1991.
 McGrath, Rick (ed.). Deep Ends: The JG Ballard Anthology 2014. The Terminal Press. 2014. 
 V. Vale (ed.) (2005). "J.G. Ballard: Conversations" (excerpts). RE/Search Publications. 
 V. Vale (ed.) and Ryan, Mike (ed). (2005). "J.G. Ballard: Quotes" (excerpts). RE/Search Publications. 

 McGrath, Rick (ed.). Deep Ends: The JG Ballard Anthology 2015. The Terminal Press. 2015. 
 McGrath, Rick (ed.). Deep Ends: The JG Ballard Anthology 2016. The Terminal Press. 2016. 
 McGrath, Rick (ed.). Deep Ends: A Ballardian Anthology 2018. The Terminal Press. 2018. 
 McGrath, Rick (ed.). Deep Ends: A Ballardian Anthology 2019. The Terminal Press. 2019. 
 McGrath, Rick (ed.). Deep Ends: A Ballardian Anthology 2020. The Terminal Press. 2020.

External links

 
 
 
 
 
 Ballardian (Simon Sellars)
 J.G. Ballard Literary Archive & Bibliographies (Rick McGrath)
 2008 profile of J. G. Ballard by Theodore Dalrymple in City Journal magazine
 J. G. Ballard Literary Estate
 J G Ballard at the British Library
J G Ballard   archives and manuscripts catalogue at the British Library

articles, reviews and essays
 
 Landscapes From a Dream , J G Ballard and modern art
 The Marriage of Reason and Nightmare, City Journal, Winter 2008
 Miracles of Life reviewed by Karl Miller in the Times Literary Supplement, 12 March 2008
 J.G. Ballard: The Glow of the Prophet Diane Johnson article on Ballard from The New York Review of Books
 Reviews of Ballard's work and John Foyster's criticism of Ballard's work featured in Edition 46 of Science Fiction magazine edited by Van Ikin.
 A review of Ballard's Running Wild J. G. Ballard's Running Wild – The Literary Life

source material
 J. G. Ballard and his family on the list of the internment camp at Japan Center for Asian Historical Records
 J.G. Ballard and Scottish artist Sir Eduardo Paolozzi

obituaries and remembrances
 Obituary in the Times Online
 Obituary by John Clute in The Independent
 Obituary in the Los Angeles Times
 Quotes from other writers on BBC News
 More writers' reactions in The Guardian
 A short appreciation in The New Yorker
 Tribute by V. Vale from RE/Search
 Letter From London: The J.G. Ballard Memorial 
 Self on Ballard by Will Self on BBC Radio 4, 26 September 2009 (Transcript and Postscript) at The Terminal Collection by Rick McGrath

1930 births
2009 deaths
20th-century atheists
20th-century British short story writers
20th-century English male writers
20th-century English non-fiction writers
20th-century English novelists
20th-century essayists
20th-century memoirists
20th-century Royal Air Force personnel
21st-century atheists
21st-century British short story writers
21st-century English male writers
21st-century English non-fiction writers
21st-century English novelists
21st-century essayists
21st-century English memoirists
Alumni of King's College, Cambridge
Alumni of Queen Mary University of London
Anti-monarchists
British technology writers
Burials at Kensal Green Cemetery
Copywriters
Deaths from cancer in England
Deaths from prostate cancer
English atheists
English autobiographers
English crime writers
English essayists
English fantasy writers
English historical novelists
English humorists
English literary critics
English male journalists
English male non-fiction writers
English male novelists
English male short story writers
English republicans
English satirists
English science fiction writers
English speculative fiction writers
English thriller writers
Futurologists
Humor researchers
Hyperreality theorists
Irony theorists
James Tait Black Memorial Prize recipients
Literacy and society theorists
Literary theorists
Magic realism writers
Mass media theorists
Metaphor theorists
Opinion journalists
Pamphleteers
People educated at The Leys School
People from Shepperton
People from Surrey
Postmodern writers
British psychological fiction writers
Philosophers of technology
Philosophical pessimists
Science fiction critics
Social commentators
Surrealist writers
Theorists on Western civilization
Trope theorists
Weird fiction writers
World War II civilian prisoners held by Japan
Writers about activism and social change
Writers about globalization
Writers from Shanghai
Writers of historical fiction set in the modern age